The First Annual National Championship was the final event of the 1960 PBA Season. It is currently known as the PBA World Championship.

Format 
192 bowlers began the tournament. They would bowl 30 games of qualifying. The field was then cut to 12 bowlers who would bowl 30 games of match play. The bowler with the highest 60 game total would win the tournament.

Tournament Recap 

The PBA tour's final event of 1960, the $44,000 First Annual National Championship, was held at Imperial Lanes, in Memphis, Tennessee. The first day of PBA competition was November 25, 1960. The competition ran until November 28, 1960. 192 bowlers competed in this event. 48 bowlers cashed in this competition. It took a 208.63 average to make the cut to the finals. Don Carter, of St. Louis, MO, won this major, his second career PBA title, and took home the first prize of $5,600. Don averaged 237.17 for 60 games, beating the 2nd place competitor by 10 pins a game. Rounding out the top 5 were Ronnie Gaudern, Harry Smith, Jack Biondolillo, and Fred Lening.

Top 10

References

Professional Bowlers Association
1960 in bowling